The 1931 Michigan Tech Huskies football team represented Michigan Technological University as an independent during the 1931 college football season. The Huskies completed the season with a 3–2 record.

Schedule

References

Michigan Tech
Michigan Tech Huskies football seasons
Michigan Tech Huskies football